A steam mill is a type of grinding mill using a stationary steam engine to power its mechanism.

 And did those feet in ancient time, Albion Flour Mills, first steam mill in London from around 1790
 Aurora Steam Grist Mill, a historic grist mill located in Aurora, Cayuga County, New York, United States
 Cincinnati Steam Paper Mill, the first steam-powered mill in Cincinnati, Ohio, United States
 Sutherland Steam Mill Museum, a restored steam woodworking mill from the 1890s located in Denmark, Nova Scotia, Canada

References

External links

Grinding mills
Steam power